John Edward Allen may be:

 John Allen (provost of Wakefield)
 John Allen (engineer)